Every Single Day is the fourth solo album by American singer-songwriter Lucy Kaplansky, released in 2001.

Track listing 
All songs by Lucy Kaplansky and Richard Litvin unless otherwise noted.
 "Written on the Back of His Hand" – 4:37
 "Crazy Dreams" (Paul Brady) – 3:52
 "Every Single Day" (Kaplansky, Litvin, Duke Levine) – 4:15
 "Don't Mind Me" – 3:31
 "Broken Things" (Julie Miller) – 4:05
 "Guilty as Sin" – 4:27
 "Nowhere" – 5:36
 "No More Excuses" – 4:04
 "Song for Molly" – 4:17
 "You're Still Standing There" (Steve Earle) – 3:25
 "The Angels Rejoiced Last Night" (Charlie Louvin, Ira Louvin) – 4:47

Personnel
Lucy Kaplansky – vocals, guitar, background vocals
Duke Levine – guitar, mandola
Larry Campbell – guitar, fiddle, mandolin, pedal steel guitar, Cittern, slide guitar
Jon Herington – guitar, slide guitar
Zev Katz – bass, baritone guitar
Jennifer Kimball – background vocals
John Gorka – background vocals
Richard Shindell – background vocals
Ben Wittman – piano, drums, percussion, keyboards
Production notes:
Ben Wittman – producer, engineer
Manfred Knoop – assistant engineer
Ian Fraser – assistant engineer
C. Taylor Crothers – photography

References 

2001 albums
Lucy Kaplansky albums
Red House Records albums